Coryphaenoides woodmasoni is a fish species belonging to the family Macrouridae and the order Gadiformes. The species was described by Alfred William Alcock in 1873 and named in honour of James Wood-Mason. There are no subspecies listed in the Catalogue of Life.

Morphology
The males can reach a length of 53 cm.

Habitat
The species is a deep-water fish that lives in depths from 1240 to 1829 meters (4070 to 6000 feet).

Geographic distribution
The range of C. woodmasoni is the Indian Ocean off the northern part of the Indian subcontinent, as well as the Mascarene Ridge and the Ninety East Ridge.

References

Sources
 Fenner, Robert M.: The Conscientious Marine Aquarist. Neptune City, New Jersey]]: T.F.H. Publications, 2001.
 Helfman, G., B. Collette and D. Facey: The diversity of fishes. Blackwell Science, Malden, Massachusetts, 1997.
 Hoese, D.F. 1986. M.M. Smith and P.C. Heemstra (eds.) Smiths' sea fishes. Springer-Verlag, Berlin.
 Maugé, L.A. 1986.  A J. Daget, J.-P. Gosse and D.F.E. Thys van den Audenaerde (eds.) Check-list of the freshwater fishes of Africa (CLOFFA). ISNB Brussels; MRAC, Tervuren, Belgium; and ORSTOM, París. Vol. 2.
 Moyle, P. and J. Cech.: Fishes: An Introduction to Ichthyology, 4th edition, Upper Saddle River, New Jersey: Prentice-Hall. 2000.
 Nelson, J.: Fishes of the World, 3rd edition. New York: John Wiley and Sons. 1994.
 Wheeler, A.: The World Encyclopedia of Fishes, 2nd edition, London: Macdonald. 1985.

Macrouridae
Taxa named by Alfred William Alcock